Patriarch George I may refer to:

 Patriarch George I of Alexandria, ruled in 621–631
 George I of Constantinople, Ecumenical Patriarch in 679–686
 Patriarch George I of Antioch, head of the Syriac Orthodox Church in 758–790